Breeding the Spawn is the second full-length album by Suffocation. Though it still employs the characteristics and elements associated with Suffocation's song writing, the production on the album is much thinner than on other albums, due to financial problems regarding their label Roadrunner Records. However it shows a more complex and technical side of the band. Most likely to make up for the relatively poor production on the album, tracks from Breeding the Spawn were re-recorded for inclusion on five Suffocation albums to date: "Breeding the Spawn" on Pierced from Within; "Prelude to Repulsion" and "Anomalistic Offerings"  on Suffocation (the latter found on the Japanese version of the album); "Marital Decimation" on Blood Oath; "Beginning of Sorrow" on Pinnacle of Bedlam and "Epitaph of the Credulous" on ...Of the Dark Light.

Track listing

Personnel
Suffocation
 Frank Mullen - vocals
 Terrance Hobbs - lead guitar
 Doug Cerrito - rhythm guitar
 Chris Richards - bass
 Mike Smith - drums
Production
Produced by Paul Bagin & Suffocation
Recorded, engineered & mixed by Paul Bagin
Mastered by Chris Gehringer

References

Suffocation (band) albums
Albums with cover art by Dan Seagrave
Roadrunner Records albums
1993 albums